Coleophora fulgidella is a moth of the family Coleophoridae. It is found in Afghanistan, Iran and the United Arab Emirates.

References

fulgidella
Moths described in 1967
Moths of Asia